Damien Mostyn (born 26 August 1978, in Australia) is an Australian former professional rugby league footballer who played first-grade for the Sydney City Roosters and Cronulla Sharks. He played as a fullback or wing.

References

Living people
1978 births
Sydney Roosters players
Cronulla-Sutherland Sharks players
Rugby league fullbacks
Rugby league wingers
Australian rugby league players
Rugby league players from Sydney